The 1917 Allentown Ambulance Corps football team, also known as the "Usaccs", represented the United States Army Ambulance Service stationed at Camp Crane in Allentown, Pennsylvania, during the 1917 college football season. Dudley Clark, formerly a football player at Oregon, was the team's coach.

The team was invited to appear in the 1918 Rose Bowl but did not receive authorization for travel to the West Coast. Allentown's declination opened the door for Camp Lewis, which lost to the Mare Island Marines on New Year's Day.

Schedule

References

Allentown Ambulance Corps
Allentown Ambulance Corps football